Manav Sthali School is a senior secondary public school in New Delhi, India. Established in 1957 by Dr. V. K. Bhatnagar, the school has sports facilities such as hockey, football, cricket, roller skating, athletics and table tennis. It has an auditorium which is the second largest for a school in Delhi.

Sports

Table Tennis
Manav Sthali houses one-of-the largest table tennis halls in Delhi. The school has been sending out majority State Ranking and National Ranking players over the last 30 years. With an indoor Table Tennis hall with over 15 tables and a robot for dedicated training, Manav Sthali has a monopoly of Table Tennis players in schools in Delhi.

Roller Hockey
Manav Sthali school has a dedicated Roller-Hockey skating rink and professional coaches that have trained one of the best Roller Skaters in Delhi. The school has bagged major honours at the Delhi State Roller Sports Championship over the years.

Hockey
The school has sent numerous hockey teams who bagged honours at the Youth Games/Delhi State Championship organised by Hockey India.
Manav Sthali students have also represented country and school at the Pacific school Games in Adelaide. Recently, the school hockey team won the first prize at the Late Daulat Ram Verma Memorial Invitational Inter School Hockey Tournament.

School Magazine
The school releases its publication called "Manav Mirror", a monthly magazine that encapsulates the events and achievements of the students and the school.

Traditions
Due to a rich cultural history of the school, the school has many traditions which are followed. One of the traditions include encouraging students to maintain a "Self-Assessment Diary" which is filled out every day. It allows students to reflect on their actions throughout the day and help them grow as a person.

Notable alumni
Gracy Singh, actress
 Pavan Malhotra, actor 
 Pulkit Samrat, actor 
Vikram Bhatnagar, sport shooter
Saransh Goila, chef on Food Food channel
Lehar Khan, actress

References

External links
  

Schools in Delhi
Educational institutions established in 1957
Central Board of Secondary Education
1957 establishments in Delhi